Grainger is a surname of English origin. It is a variant of the surname Granger which is an occupational name for a farm bailiff. The farm bailiff oversaw the collection of rent and taxes from the barns and storehouses of the lord of the manor. This officer's Anglo-Norman title was grainger, and Old French grangier, which are both derived from the Late Latin granicarius (a derivative of granica, meaning "granary").

People surnamed Grainger
Allerdale Grainger (1848–1923), full name Henry Allerdale Grainger, newspaper editor and politician in South Australia
Brian Grainger (born 1983), American musician
Charles F. Grainger American mayor
Colin Grainger (born 1933), English footballer
Daniel Grainger (born 1986), English footballer
David Liddell-Grainger (1930–2007), Scottish politician
Esther Grainger (1912–1990), Welsh artist
Gail Grainger (born 1954), English actress
 George Grainger (cricketer) (1887–1977), English cricketer
 George Grainger (footballer) (1921–1998), Australian rules footballer
 George G. Grainger (1876–1944), American football player and coach
Holliday Grainger (born 1988), English actress
Ian Liddell-Grainger British, politician
James Grainger (c. 1721–1766) Scottish poet and physician
John Grainger (1830–1891), Irish cleric and antiquarian
John Grainger (footballer, born 1912), English professional (soccer) footballer
John Grainger (footballer, born 1924), English professional (soccer) footballer
John Grainger (politician) (c. 1803–1872), land owner and member of the South Australian Legislative Council
John Harry Grainger, architect and civil engineer
Katherine Grainger (born 1975), Scottish Olympic rower
Martin Allerdale Grainger (1874–1941), English born Canadian journalist, author, forester
Martin Grainger (born 1972), English (soccer) football player
Natalie Grainger (born 1977), English professional squash player
Nicholas Grainger (born 1994), English swimmer
Oliver Grainger, Canadian voice actor
Percy Grainger (1882–1961), Australian-born American composer and pianist
Porter Grainger (1891–c.1955), African-American pianist, songwriter, playwright, and music publisher
Richard Grainger, (1797–1861), British builder
Roy Gordon Grainger (born 1962), New Zealand born, physicist
Sam Grainger, (1924–1986), American comic book artist
William W. Grainger (19??–19??), American founder of W.W. Grainger industrial supply company

Fictional people surnamed Grainger
Chlo Grainger, fictional character on the television series Waterloo Road
Mr. Ernest Grainger, fictional character on the television series Are You Being Served?
Mika Grainger, fictional character on the television series Waterloo Road
Scott Grainger, Sr., character from the American soap opera The Young and the Restless

Notes

See also
Granger (name)

English-language surnames